The European Squadron, also known as the European Station, was a part of the United States Navy in the late 19th century and the early 1900s. The squadron was originally named the Mediterranean Squadron and renamed following the American Civil War. In 1905, the squadron was absorbed into the North Atlantic Fleet.

Second Anglo-Egyptian War

The Egyptian Expedition in June and July 1882 was a response by the United States to the British and French attack on Alexandria during the Anglo-Egyptian War. To protect American citizens and their property within the city, ships of the European Squadron, under Rear Admiral James Nicholson, were sent to Egypt with orders to observe the conflict ashore and make a landing if necessary. British and French forces heavily damaged the city and started a large fire so a force of marines and sailors were landed and they assisted in fire fighting and guarding the American consulate from insurgents.
Casper F. Goodrich, who served as an executive officer on the USS Lancaster, commanded the landing party and would later publish an extensive report on the bombardment.

Early 20th century
The European Squadron returned to U.S. waters at the start of the Spanish–American War in April 1898, and did not return to Europe until July 1901, when Admiral Bartlett J. Cromwell was placed in command with the cruiser  as flagship. Other ships of the squadron from July 1901 included the cruiser  and the gunboat .

Commanders

References

External links 
 Notes on U.S. Fleet Organisation and Disposition, 1898–1941

 

Ship squadrons of the United States Navy